Jonathan Simmons, better known as Gunner Stahl, is an American photographer from Atlanta, Georgia.

He is best known for his candid photographs of well known hip-hop musicians the Weeknd, 21 Savage, A$AP Rocky, Drake, Swae Lee, Billie Eilish, Lil Uzi Vert, Playboi Carti, Mac Miller, Nipsey Hussle, Gucci Mane and Young Thug among others.

Career 
At 18 years old, Stahl started taking pictures. Initially, he focused on everyday life, shooting pictures of friends at school, parties, parks and concerts. In 2014, he began spending more time with, and subsequently shooting portraits of, then up and coming musicians like Swae Lee. In 2019, Gunner Stahl published Portraits, a book that includes pictures of well known musicians like A$AP Rocky, Drake, Billie Eilish and 21 Savage. Gunner is one of the most prolific photographers in hip-hop culture. He has been praised for his vision and influence on this photography scene.

References 

American portrait photographers
Year of birth missing (living people)
Living people